NGC 2659 is an open cluster in the constellation Vela. It was discovered by John Herschel on 3 February, 1835. It is of Trumpler class III3m. It is a young cluster, with age nearly 8 million years. The core of the cluster is 1.93 parsec (6.3 light years) across and the total radius is 3.6 pc (11.7 light years). The total number of stars that belong to the cluster is estimated to be 1,801 ± 608 stars and the total mass 857 ± 237 . Among its members, one is a Be star, with four more possible Be stars.

References

External links 

2659
Vela (constellation)
Open clusters